Security police officers  are employed by or for a governmental agency or corporations to provide security services to those properties.

Security police protect facilities, properties, personnel, users, visitors and enforce certain laws and administrative regulations.  Most security police have limited arrest authority.  The law enforcement powers of security police vary by federal, state and city law.

Different from general Police departments, the primary focus of security police is on the protection of specific properties or facilities. This causes some overlap with functions normally performed by security guards.

In some countries, security police is the name given to the secret security and intelligence services charged with protecting the state at the highest level, including responsibilities such as personal protection of the head of state, counter-espionage, and anti-terrorism.

Types of special police and similar organizations

Examples of Special police may include:

United States
 Campus special / security police, who are often hired and sworn in as state law enforcement officers.
 Housing special / security police, who protect publicly owned housing or "housing facilities"
 Hospital / Medical center special / security police such as the Texas Medical Center Police
 Park special / security police, who primarily protect parks facilities.
 Capitol special / security police, who protect state properties such as legislative and executive buildings, which can also include executive protection functions
 Special police (also auxiliary police), in the protection of public properties, such as the United States Holocaust Memorial Museum which is protected by sworn special police officers as authorized by D.C. Code, § 4-114 (1981)
 Court special / security officer who provide police and security services at court houses
 Company police to provide security police services on company or private property by contract, where local law permits private organizations to contract for police powers; this for example includes railway police.
 U.S. Federal Reserve Police, the law enforcement unit of the Federal Reserve System, the central banking system of the United States

Legal authority of special / security police officers 
All special / security police officers derive their authority from the listed sources:

 The laws of their nation, territory or municipality  federal / state / city
 The property rights of their employing or contracting agency or activity, which may be public or private or a mixture of both

These powers may include limited power to detain, arrest, investigate criminal offenses, carry weapons.

Some special / security police have peace officers with the same powers as regular peace officers.  Others have enhanced powers which are limited by law to their specific location.

Special special / security police around the world

Australia 
The RAAF Security Police is responsible for base security and policing the RAAF and they work closely with the Airfield Defence Guards. The Military Working Dog Unit also provides a further security function.

Most state police force in Australia employs a team of officers known as Protective Services Officers (PSOs). Stationed in and around public or government buildings, these PSOs are armed (to varying degrees) and wear slightly different uniforms. They are also called upon by regular police officers if the need arises. They generally undergo training at the state police college and share many resources. Some police officers have used the PSO path as a stepping stone to their current roles.

In New South Wales, an armed internal unit of the New South Wales Police Force is staffed by special constables who hold identical powers and immunities of police officers at the rank of constable. Special constables wear similar uniforms to police officers, carry arms and appointments and are issued warrant cards and badges. Special constables provide security services to select government and police complexes.

Germany 
The Polizei beim Deutschen Bundestag (Polizei DBT, commonly known as Bundestagspolizei) is the smallest and least known police agency in Germany. It is responsible for the protection of the premises of the Bundestag in Berlin. Because the chief of the Bundestagspolizei is the president of the Bundestag (Federal Parliament of Germany) and not the minister of the interior, it can not be called a federal police agency. The number of their officers is not published yet. The Bundestagspolizei recruit their staff from all German police agencies.

Hong Kong 
A special division of the Hong Kong Police Force, known as the Airport Security Unit (ASU), has been engaged by airports in Hong Kong (HK), to provide security services. These personnel have higher fitness standards and are issued with heavier firepower, than ordinary HK police officers.

India 
The Indian central government maintains several security police forces:

The CISF is The Central Industrial Security Force (established in its present form: June 15, 1983) is a paramilitary security force in India. The CISF duties are to protect public properties and private properties, as well as:

To protect public sector
To protect private sector
Airport security

It is one of the largest central paramilitary forces in India. Strength is nearly 105,000 and rivals other countries when it comes to a government agency providing security to such a large number of industries. 

Many of the international airports in India were the responsibility of the city or district police. CSIA for example, was originally serviced by members of Mumbai Police (then known as Bombay Police), but contract for security has been handed over to the CISF.

The Railway Protection Force (RPF) is known for protecting the railways of India and ensuring safety of citizens in trains.

The Defence Security Force protects Ministry of Defence property.

Japan

In Japan, security police, also known as "SP" are law enforcement officers that provide security for domestic and foreign dignitaries.  Their role to dignitary protection is similar to that of the United States Secret Service.

Malaysia

The Royal Malaysia Police are generally responsible for protecting and policing the airports, seaports and government sites in Malaysia. Unlike several other countries, there is no state police for individual states.

Portugal
The Navy Establishments Police is a small security police force responsible for protecting several of the facilities of the Portuguese Navy, including the navy central administration buildings, the Lisbon Naval Base and the Navy Museum. 

The Navy Establishments Police is a non-military service, in contrast with the Naval Police (Polícia Naval) which is the Portuguese Navy's military police.

South Africa
During the 1960s the South African Security Police were known for detaining and interrogating members of the public, often leading to the victims death or disappearance, especially in the height of the Apartheid era.

Sri Lanka
During the 1990s the Sri Lanka Police created a sub unit with its members known as police security assistants. They were mostly limited to protection of police and governmental facilities.

Sweden

An ordningsvakt is a person deputized by the Swedish Police Authority to act as a law enforcement officer with limited police powers. His main mission is to assist in maintaining public order. 

An ordningsvakt may carry a baton, firearm, and handcuffs,  may use a police dog, and is authorized to use force if necessary to maintain order. An ordningsvakt may reject, remove and, if necessary, detain, a person who disturbs the public order in his area of responsibility. He may also detain persons suffering from alcohol intoxication, seize alcoholic beverages, make a citizen's arrest (as everyone else), seize evidence after a citizen's arrest, and search a detained person. Detained persons and evidence are to be turned over to the police, who has a general command authority over him. An ordningsvakt carries a special badge, and, since 2012, wears a standardized uniform (irrespective of employer). 

In February 2021, there were 7,830 persons deputized as ordningsvakter in Sweden. Of these, about 4,100 were employed by security companies while the rest had personal assignments from private or public clients. Previously, the assignments were mostly on a persona basis keeping public order at public events of a short duration such as soccer games and dances. 

Nowadays they also serve as employees of security firms on a permanent basis in the Stockholm metro, in courts and at public meetings in municipalities and regions. The number of sworn police officers in Sweden were at about the same time 20,942.

Taiwan
The special police (保安警察, Bao-an Jingcha) is known as the Security Police of Taiwan.

United Kingdom

Northern Ireland
The Northern Ireland Security Guard Service (not to be confused with MOD Police or MPGS) is a civilian armed guard service in which all civilian security officers are attested as special constables. They provide security at Ministry of Defence establishments in Northern Ireland.

The Belfast International Airport Constabulary is a small, armed, specialised police force responsible for policing Belfast International Airport, Northern Ireland.

United States
In the United States, the laws concerning peace officers vary widely from federal / state / city.  Each tate legislature with approval from the governor has the ability to modify the powers of peace officers in their state through legislation.

Federal
Most, if not all, of the federal government's uniformed police officers are security police who primarily serve to protect federal property and personnel. An example is the Federal Protective Service who protect federal buildings.

By states
Some major cities such as Washington, D.C., Los Angeles, San Francisco and Boston, MA have a security police service separate from their city police. These may be employees of a public agency or private contractors.

California
The complexity of special policing and special police authority is illustrated by these examples, which are not meant to be exhaustive.

In California, peace officer powers are granted by the California Penal Code under a number of different code sections.  Cities, counties and special districts are authorized to form their own law enforcement agencies.  Peace officer training is regulated by a state agency, Peace Officer Standards and Training or POST.  This training can consist of as little as a 40-hour PC 832 course (for park rangers, probation officers or fire investigators who might make an arrest in the course of their duties), or as much as a 700-hour POST Basic Academy (for entry level peace officers).

Security guards (including off duty peace officers) may only carry firearms in private employment if licensed by the state licensing authority, the Bureau of Security and Investigative Services.  Persons regularly employed by public agencies as security guards, however, may be exempt from BSIS regulation, if they have completed POST-certified training in accordance with PC 832 or other penal code sections.  However, security guards employed by a private employer are still regulated by BSIS even though the client may be a public agency.

Orange County
Orange County Sheriff's Department special officers are duly appointed and dedicated California public officers under California Penal Code section 831.4. (a) (1), who provide citation enforcement and security services for the department in connection with the county bus system, airport, the operations of the local courts and the custody of local prisoners.

These sheriff's special officers attend a 16-week training academy at the Orange County Sheriff's Regional Training Academy that instructs new officers on laws of arrest, firearms training, arrest and control techniques, physical fitness, field and patrol tactics, first responder medical training, and corrections-custody training. Being duly non-sworn California public officers, Orange County Sheriff's special officers maintain public officer authority while on duty

Los Angeles
In the Los Angeles metropolitan area, there are numerous examples of security police with different levels of authority and responsibility.

 Los Angeles County Sheriff's Department - employs Security assistants (security officer I) and Security officers (security officer II) who assist deputy sheriffs in the protection of various county government facilities. The LASD absorbed the Los Angeles County Office of Public Safety Police on June 30, 2010.
 Security assistants are assigned to the Transit Services Bureau serve as fare inspectors.  Security assistants and security officers assigned to the Court Services Division provide weapons screening and general security of the county's superior and municipal courts.  Security officers assigned to the Community College Division provide campus security to the county's community colleges.  Additionally, security officers may also be assigned to provide security at other county facilities.
 Sheriff's security officers in compliance with applicable laws and regulations, such as peace officer ("POST") training, have limited peace officer powers while on duty and are outside the authority of the state security guard licensing agency, the Bureau of Security and Investigative Services (BSIS) with respect to their work for the county.
 Los Angeles County Metropolitan Transportation Authority -  transit security officers are uniformed, 836.5 (a) PC public officers, who serve the MTA (Metro) by providing security for critical transportation infrastructure and internal revenue protection.  Transit security officers undergo a selection process that is similar to that for police (including an identical background investigation, as well as a psychological review and physical agility test), as well as an 800-hour internal training program and POST-certified arrest and firearms course.

New Orleans
The City of New Orleans Department of Police in accordance with New Orleans Home Rule Charter section 4-502 (2) (a) (b) and New Orleans Municipal Code 17-271 MCS 90–86, deputizes armed security officers, private investigators, college campus police, city, state, and federal agencies, within the city limits, with limited police powers as New Orleans Police special officers. 

New Orleans Municipal Code 17-271 MCS 30-1122 states that it shall be unlawful for any person to act as an armed guard unless they are a peace officer. Louisiana R.S. 40:1379.1 (b) states that the special officer, when performing those tasks requiring a special officer's commission, shall have the same powers and duties as a peace officer. Special officers may make arrests for felony or misdemeanor offenses on the property or area they are to protect, patrol, or in relation to their direct assignment. The special officer, when making an arrest, may pat down the arrested subject for weapons. Special officers are to turn over arrested subjects and pertaining evidence to a New Orleans Police officer. Special officers are to honor all subpoenas on arrest made and appear in court to testify. Special officers, when not on a particular assignment, are regarded as private citizens and have no police powers. However, special officers still may make arrests for a felony, whether in or out of their presence, while not on a particular assignment, under Louisiana Law CCRP art.214 arrest by private person; when lawful.

Venezuela
The Internal Security Division is a security police unit of the Bolivarian Service of National Intelligence. Dressed with black berets and armed with M16s and M4s. This unit provides security at counterintelligence territorial bases and other facilities. They have police powers.

Obsolete uses

Nazi Germany
 The Sicherheitspolizei, often abbreviated as SiPo, was a term used in Nazi Germany to describe the state political and criminal investigation security agencies. It was made up by the combined forces of the Gestapo (secret state police) and the Kripo (criminal police) between 1936 and 1939. As a formal agency, the SiPo was folded into the RSHA in 1939, but the term continued to be used informally until the end of the Third Reich.
 The Reichssicherheitsdienst (RSD) was the security police assigned to protect dignitaries.

United States
 Security police is a term once used for the United States Air Force Security Forces, who function as the military police of the United States Air Force.

See also
 Police
 Border guard
 Bouncer
 Traffic guard
 Police officer
 Security guard
 List of protective service agencies
 Provost
 United States Air Force Security Forces

Citations

General references 
 "A NEW MEMBER OF THE LASD FAMILY" by John Herrera, Star News, September 2006
 [http://www.mcfarlandpub.com/book-2.php?isbn=0-7864-1574-6 The Privatization of Police in America]: An Analysis and Case Study. McFarland & Company, 2003.

External links
 History of the Los Angeles County MTA Police

Crime prevention
Law enforcement units
Security